The Wedding Singer is a musical with music by Matthew Sklar, lyrics by Chad Beguelin, and a book by Beguelin and Tim Herlihy. It is based on the 1998 film of the same name. The musical revolves around Robbie, who sings at weddings, his failed relationship with his former fiancée, and his romance with a new love, Julia.

The musical premiered on Broadway in 2006 and had several US tours starting in 2007. It was nominated for the 2006 Tony Award for Best Musical. It subsequently has had many international productions.

Synopsis

Act 1
Robbie Hart, a wedding singer, lives with his Grandma Rosie in Ridgefield, New Jersey. He and his band play a great wedding gig ("It’s Your Wedding Day"). During his usual "warm-up-the-crowd routine," Robbie proudly announces that he will be married to his beloved fiancée Linda the next day. At the wedding gig, Robbie meets a waitress named Julia Sullivan, who can't wait to get married ("Someday"). Afterward, Robbie tries to write a sweet (eventually corny) love song to Linda, with help from Julia, whom he had just met during the previous wedding ("Awesome"). The following day, however, Linda dumps Robbie at the altar, with only a note claiming that she wants to be the wife of a rock star and not just a wedding singer ("A Note from Linda"). Meanwhile, an anxious Julia goes out to dinner with her Wall Street banker boyfriend, Glen Guglia, hoping he will pop the question, which he does ("Pop!").

Robbie falls into a deep depression ("Somebody Kill Me"), but is urged by his bandmates Sammy and George, and even his grandmother ("A Note from Grandma"), to use that intense emotion to get back on his feet. However, the angry Robbie does nothing but enrage the guests at the next wedding gig ("Casualty of Love"), and he is soon thrown into the dumpster by the groom and an angry crowd of wedding guests. With some convincing from his friend Julia, Robbie does "Come Out of the Dumpster," but changes his singing gigs strictly to bar mitzvahs ("Today You Are a Man"). After the Shapiro bar mitzvah ("George’s Prayer"), Julia convinces Robbie to help her register for her wedding, as her fiancé Glen is, as usual, busy with business-related affairs ("Not That Kind of Thing").

While at the mall, Robbie and Julia meet up with Julia's cousin and best friend Holly, who convinces the "faux duo" that Julia needs to practice her wedding kiss. Robbie and Julia awkwardly and lovingly kiss, only to be interrupted by the reality that Julia is marrying Glen. After seeing the kiss, Holly decides that she should go out with Robbie. Julia, still shocked by the kiss, hastily agrees with Holly. Much later that night, Robbie, Holly, Julia, Glen, Sammy, and George go to a club in New York City ("Saturday Night in the City"). Here Robbie finally realizes that Glen is a cheater and that he, Robbie, loves Julia. Holly realizes this too and tells Robbie that Julia is marrying Glen because of his money and security. Upon hearing this, Robbie says, "Well, I‘m in big trouble, then. But maybe I could change."

Act 2
The next morning, Robbie visits Glen at his Wall Street office to get a job and learn how to be like him in order to secretly impress Julia ("All About the Green"). Later, Julia and Holly recall the events of the night before and Julia begins to question if rich men are truly better people ("Someday - Reprise"). Sammy arrives and tries to woo Holly, but is given the cold shoulder, but Holly can't help but feel that despite his flaws, there is no other man who could replace Sammy ("Right in Front of Your Eyes"). Later in the evening, a "Glenified" Robbie finds Julia at his doorstep and tries to woo her. When that doesn't work, he accuses her of marrying Glen for his material possessions. Julia is stung and walks away from Robbie, throwing a present in his face: personalized blank sheet music. After all, Julia truly cares about Robbie and wants him to sing at weddings again, especially her own.

Robbie realizes what he's done and drinks his sorrows away at a local bar ("All About the Green - Reprise"). Sammy and George go to the bar and try to convince Robbie that staying "Single" is the right thing to do. Inadvertently, Sammy and George end up persuading Robbie into going to Julia's house to tell her how he really feels. Meanwhile, at Julia's house, Julia is with her mother, Angie, trying on her wedding dress, but is having doubts about marrying Glen because of recent events with her and Robbie. Julia's mother reassures her that Glen really is "Mr. Right" and questions why Julia would leave him for a wedding singer. But Julia still has doubts. Robbie looks into Julia's window and sees her trying on her wedding dress and smiling at her reflection. He thinks it's because she's marrying Glen, but Julia is smiling only because she's imagining being Robbie's wife ("If I Told You"). Robbie comes across Glen in the middle of a bachelor party. Glen invites Robbie, but Robbie simply begs him not to cheat on Julia anymore. Glen gets defensive and condemns Robbie. Robbie gets knocked down and Glen fires him. Robbie goes home drunk and dazed only to find Linda in his bed, wanting him back ("Let Me Come Home"). Before she can fully apologize Robbie falls into a deep slumber.

The next day, Julia goes to Robbie's house to tell him how she really feels, only to find Linda instead. This scares Julia into eloping with Glen to Las Vegas. Meanwhile, Robbie wakes up and promptly kicks Linda (the "psycho") out. At Grandma Rosie's 50th anniversary party, Robbie finds out from Holly what happened to Julia. Only then do Robbie and Julia realize that they may never see each other again, and they may never get to tell each other what's on their minds ("Not That Kind of Thing / If I Told You - Reprise").

With urging from his grandmother and Sammy, Robbie goes to the airport and gets on the next plane to Vegas ("Move That Thang"). With the help of a group of Vegas impersonators (Billy Idol, Mr. T, Ronald Reagan, Tina Turner, Cyndi Lauper, Nancy Reagan, and Imelda Marcos), Robbie crashes Julia's and Glen's wedding at the Little White House Chapel and sings his new song to Julia ("Grow Old With You"). Glen is outraged that Robbie and Julia still have feelings for each other and blurts out that he cheated on Julia with "like a hundred other women." Upon hearing this, the impersonators beat Glen up, and Robbie proposes to Julia. She says yes, on one condition: "Will you sing at my wedding?" The answer is a resounding "Yes!" Later, Mr. and Mrs. Robbie Hart are wed ("Finale").

Productions
US
The stage musical version of The Wedding Singer had its world premiere with a limited run pre-Broadway engagement at the 5th Avenue Theatre in Seattle.  Opening 8 February 2006 (with previews as of 31 January), the 5th Avenue engagement ended with a 19 February 2006 performance.

The musical opened on Broadway at the Al Hirschfeld Theatre on 27 April 2006 (with previews as of 30 March) and closed on 31 December 2006 after 284 performances. It was directed by John Rando, with choreography by Rob Ashford, and featured Stephen Lynch as Robbie.

The first national tour had a preview performance on August 31, 2007, at the Curtis M. Phillips Center in Gainesville, Florida, and opened September 4, at the Birmingham–Jefferson Convention Complex in Birmingham, Alabama. After playing 31 cities, the tour closed at Harrah's in Atlantic City, New Jersey, on August 31, 2008. Paul Stancato directed the tour based on the original Broadway direction by John Rando, and Chris Bailey provided choreography, which was based on Rob Ashford's Broadway work. The creative team also included John Mezzio (musical supervisor/coordinator/conductor), Scott Pask (scenic designer), Brian MacDevitt (lighting designer), Gregory Gale (costume designer) and Lucas J. Corrubia, Jr. (sound designer). Merritt David Janes played Robbie.

A different touring production of the show opened on September 28, 2009 in Fayetteville, Arkansas, at the Walton Arts Center. It continued until March 28, 2010, ending in New Haven, Connecticut, at the Shubert Theatre, having traveled throughout the US and Canada. This production was produced by Prather Entertainment Group and directed by Seth Reines, with choreography by Amy McCleary.

The show has become a popular show among community theaters and high schools.

UK
A UK tour opened at the Manchester Palace Theatre in February 2008 starring Jonathan Wilkes as Robbie and Natalie Casey as Julia, and toured the UK through July 2008.

A production of The Wedding Singer helmed by director Nick Winston had its premiere run at the Curve Theater (Leicester) 9 – 18 February 2017 and is scheduled to play a total of 33 UK venues from February to October 2017. This production features Jon Robyns as Robbie, Ruth Madoc as Grandma Rosie, Ray Quinn as Glen, Cassie Compton as Julia, Roxanne Pallett as Holly, Ashley Emerson as Sammy, Samuel Holmes as George, and Tara Verloop as Linda. Lucie Jones was announced as Pallett's replacement as Holly in May 2017. Stephanie Clift will play Holly at the venues that Lucie is not.

The same production opened for a Limited run at the Troubadour Wembley Park Theatre from the 30th January to the 1st March 2020. This production featured Kevin Clifton as Robbie, Sandra Dickinson as Grandma Rosie, Rhiannon Chesterman as Julia, Andrew Carthy as George, Ashley Emerson as Sammy, Erin Bell as Linda, Jonny Fines as Glen, Tara Verloop as Holly. The cast was completed by Aimee Moore, Andy Brady, Ellie Seaton, Jordan Crouch, Lori Haley Fox, Morgan Jackson, Nathan Ryles, Paris Green, Simon Anthony, and Vanessa Grace Lee. Featuring Ben Cracknell's lighting design helmed by Production Electrician Chris Vaughn and Followspotted by Dan Heesem and Paul Jennings. 
 
International
El Rey de Bodas, the Spanish-language version (which translates as "The King of Weddings"), played in Madrid in 2007, starring Naim Thomas as Robbie, María Virumbrales as Julia and María Adamuz as Holly.

The Japanese version ran in Tokyo at the Nissay Theatre in 2008.

The South Australian premiere was in 2008 at the Arts Theatre, Adelaide.

The Philippine production ran at the Meralco Theater in 2010. The show starred Gian Magdangal.

The debut German-language production played at Theater im Neukloster in Wiener Neustadt, Austria, in 2011. The first production in Germany played in 2012 at the Waldbühne Kloster Oesede in Georgsmarienhütte.

In 2015, a Spanish-language version was presented in Mexico by Britstudio Artes Escénicas at Teatro Carlos Lazo.

In 2022, Australian productions took place in Sydney, Melbourne and Perth.

Songs

Act I
"It's Your Wedding Day" – Robbie, Sammy, George, and Company
"Someday" – Julia and Female Ensemble
"Awesome" – Robbie and Julia
"Someday (Robbie's Reprise)" – Robbie
"A Note from Linda" – Linda
"It's Your Wedding Day (Reprise 1)" – Robbie
"Pop!" – Holly, Angie, Julia, and Company *
"Somebody Kill Me" (music and lyrics by Tim Herlihy and Adam Sandler) – Robbie
"A Note from Grandma" – Rosie
 “It’s Your Wedding Day (Reprise 2)” – Robbie and Wedding Guests
"Casualty of Love" – Robbie, Sideburns Lady, Loser Guy, Large Lady, and Company
"Come Out of the Dumpster" – Julia and Robbie
"Today You Are a Man" – Robbie, George, and Sammy
"George's Prayer" – George
"Not That Kind of Thing" – Robbie, Julia, and Company
"Saturday Night in the City" – Company

Act II
"All About the Green" – Glen, Robbie, and Company
"Someday (Julia's Reprise)" – Julia
"Right in Front of Your Eyes" – Holly and Sammy
"All About the Green (Reprise)" – Robbie, Bum, and Ricky
"Single" – Sammy, Ricky, Bum, George, Robbie, and Male Ensemble
"If I Told You" – Robbie and Julia
"Let Me Come Home" – Linda
"Not That Kind of Thing / If I Told You (Reprise)" – Rosie, Robbie, and Julia
"Move That Thang" – Rosie and George
"Grow Old With You" (music and lyrics by Adam Sandler and Tim Herlihy) – Robbie and Julia
"Finale" – Company

*The song "Pop!" was removed for the US national tour because the set pieces for the song were too big. With this plot change, Glen proposes to Julia over the phone instead of at the restaurant in "Pop!"

Original Broadway cast
Stephen Lynch as Robbie Hart
Laura Benanti as Julia Sullivan
Amy Spanger as Holly
Matthew Saldivar as Sammy
Kevin Cahoon as George
Richard H. Blake as Glen Guglia
Rita Gardner as Rosie
Felicia Finley as Linda

Reception
Ben Brantley, in his review for The New York Times, wrote "the show has at least a flutter of a hedonist's pulse. And if its formulaic catering to an established public appetite feels cynical, the cast members exude earnestness and good nature. They are a personable enough lot, which is not the same as saying that they have personality. For, as so often happens when good (or even not-so-good) films turn into stage shows, the first things to be jettisoned are sharp edges and authentically quirky characters." He further noted "wispy" plot, Mr. Sklar's "pastiche score", and that "Rob Ashford's choreography is replete with literal-minded tributes to 1980's music videos for era-defining songs like 'Thriller,' 'Material Girl' and 'Flashdance.'"

The Variety reviewer wrote that "Forced as it is, this is a fizzy confection offering enough easy enjoyment to attract the outer boroughs and the tourist trade. It's also derivative by design, to some extent making a virtue of its inherent phoniness via winking acknowledgement. Where the 1998 film ended with a scene featuring '80s icon Billy Idol, the stage adaptation corrals not only an Idol impersonator but a fake Tina Turner, Imelda Marcos, Cyndi Lauper, Mr. T and Ronald Reagan. Retro overkill is a distinct risk here, but one mainstream auds are unlikely to mind."

Awards and nominations

Original Broadway production

References

External links
 
The Wedding Singer plot and production information at guidetomusicaltheatre.com
 The Wedding Singer at the Music Theatre International website

2006 musicals
Broadway musicals
Rock musicals
West End musicals
Musicals based on films
Fiction set in the 1980s
New Jersey in fiction
Ridgefield, New Jersey